Opisthoncana is a monotypic genus of  jumping spiders containing the single species, Opisthoncana formidabilis. It was first described by Embrik Strand in 1913, and is only found on New Ireland. The name is a variation of the salticid genus Opisthoncus.

References

External links
 Diagnostic drawings of O. formidabilis

Monotypic Salticidae genera
Salticidae
Spiders of Oceania
Taxa named by Embrik Strand